Lorente is a surname. Notable people with this surname include:
África Lorente Castillo (1954–2020), Moroccan-born Spanish politician and activist
Eduardo Lorente (born 1977), Spanish swimmer and Olympian
Jaime Lorente (born 1991), Spanish actor
José Alfredo Lorente (born 1994), Puerto Rican singer and songwriter
Justo Lorente (born 1994), Nicaraguan footballer
Patricio Lorente (born 1969), Argentine scholar, Wikimedian, and academic administrator
Rafael Lorente de Nó (1902–1990), Spanish neuroscientist
Sylvie Lorente, French mechanical engineer
Joaquín Ruiz Lorente (born 1966), Spanish basketball player and manager

See also
Llorente (disambiguation)